The Sphinx is a 1933 American Pre-Code mystery drama film directed by Phil Rosen. The film was remade by William Beaudine as Phantom Killer in 1942.

Plot
A man comes out of the office of "Garfield Investment Company". He meets the janitor in the stairs and asks him for a match, and then what time it is. "It's nine" the Italian-American janitor Luigi Bacciagalupi answers and wants to know from which apartment he came out. The man leaves without answering. Shortly after, the janitor finds a dead man in the office of "Garfield Investment Company". Newspaperman Burton from the Chronicle is there to talk with the inspector. Before he can see him he talks with the watching police officer, and after a while, realizes that the Garfield Investment Company just that morning went bankrupt. "Another broker went down the flush". The janitor recognizes on the police records the man who came out of the office, Mr. Breen. During the trial he sticks to what he has seen and what he has heard, though two different doctors testify that Mr. Breen is deaf and mute since birth.

Young chronicle newspaperman Jerry Crane, in love with his good-looking girl colleague, has a feeling that Breen is a strange guy and tries to convince her not to go for interview to his house. Meantime a young broker tells him he has a hint, if he gets enough money for it. Breen comes to see the young broker before at half past eight the Burton comes to his house. A second time Mr. Breen asks for the time after seeing his victim. The puzzling case has the parallel love story of the two newspaper-people of the Chronicle. While Burton, who wants to marry Crane, is skeptical about Breen, Crane is fascinated, and dedicates him a series of articles. When Inspector Riley thinks he saw Breen hearing the playing of the piano when they are in his house, the next morning a third dead man is on the list.

Cast
 Lionel Atwill as Jerome Breen
 Sheila Terry as Jerry Crane
 Theodore Newton as Jack Burton
 Paul Hurst as Detective Terrence Aloysius Hogan
 Luis Alberni as Luigi Baccigalupi
 Robert Ellis as Inspector James Riley
 Lucien Prival as Jenks, the Butler
 Lillian Leighton as Mother Werner
 Paul Fix as Dave Werner
 George 'Gabby' Hayes as Det. Casey

References

External links

 
 
 
 
 

1933 films
American mystery films
American black-and-white films
1930s mystery films
Films directed by Phil Rosen
Films directed by Wilfred Lucas
Monogram Pictures films
1930s English-language films
1930s American films